Gilbert Bruce Meyers (born June 14, 1948) is an American politician. He served as a Republican member for the 32nd district in the Montana House of Representatives for the 2015 session. A Native American, he is a member of the Chippewa-Cree tribe.

References

1948 births
Living people
Native American state legislators in Montana
People from Sanders County, Montana
Republican Party members of the Montana House of Representatives
People from Box Elder, Montana
Cree in Montana